Marvin E. "Marv" Diemer (May 30, 1924 – April 23, 2013) was an American businessman and legislator.

Born in New Auburn, Minnesota, Diemer served in the United States Marine Corps during World War II. He graduated from Drake University in 1950 and was a public accountant in Cedar Falls, Iowa. He served in the Iowa House of Representatives as a Republican 1979–1991. He died in Cedar Falls, Iowa.

Notes

1924 births
2013 deaths
People from Cedar Falls, Iowa
People from Sibley County, Minnesota
Drake University alumni
Businesspeople from Iowa
Republican Party members of the Iowa House of Representatives
20th-century American businesspeople
United States Marine Corps personnel of World War II